Mary Stuart James MacMurphy (James; after marriage, MacMurphy or McMurphy; September 1, 1846 – January 31, 1934) was an American teacher, lecturer, clubwoman, and author. She was the author of Only Glimpses (1887) and Ferns of Wisconsin. She held positions at Albany Female Academy, Robinson Female Seminary, College Preparatory School, and Waller High School.

Early life and education
Mary L. Stuart James was born in Deerfield, New Hampshire, September 1, 1846. She was the daughter of Capt. Joseph Warren and Harriet Neeley (Hoyt, or Hoitt) James. Woodworth's brother, Col. H. E. Parker, became editor of the Bradford Opinion.

MacMurphy received her education at the Pinkerton Academy, Derry, New Hampshire. She completed the first course at the Salem, Massachusetts Normal School, 1864; and the advanced course, 1866. She then attended Mlle. Tribou's Academy, Paris, France. MacMurphy also did special studies at Vassar College and the University of Chicago.

Career
In the autumn of 1866, MacMurphy became head of the Senior department of the Albany Female Academy, a position she held for several years. Later, at the request of Eben S. Stearns, Principal, she accepted the position of preceptress at Robinson Female Seminary. 

On April 22, 1870, she married Rev. Jesse Gibson MacMurphy (1845-1938), and became a resident of Racine, Wisconsin. Their children were Sarah Russell, James Alexander, and Jerome Case.

In Racine, she soon became principal of the College Preparatory School, a position she held for 15 years. She was also a lecturer at the Avon Art Club. In 1895, she was called to Chicago as head of the history department in the Waller High School, remaining until 1911. She was interested in art work at the Art Institute of Chicago.

MacMurphy was the author of Only Glimpses and Ferns of Wisconsin. She also engaged in French translations.

MacMurphy was a member of the Woman's Club and Avon Art Club, Racine (president of the former 1894–96; director of the latter, 1879–94). She was a member of the Chicago and Oak Park Woman's Clubs and the Glaux Syntelia, Chicago. MacMurphy was a lecturer to the Sesame Circle, Oak Park, Illinois, four years; and a leader of the Culture Club, North Chicago, four years. She was a member of and active worker in the Daughters of the American Revolution, the Derry Woman's Club, and the American Red Cross. She served as chair of the Art Department, New Hampshire Federation of Women's Clubs, 1915–17.

Personal life
In 1911, she returned to New England, engaging in foreign travel and close study. By 1919, MacMurphy was residing in Derry Village, New Hampshire. 

She died at her home in Derry Village on January 31, 1934, and was interred at Forest Hill Cemetery in East Derry.

Selected works
 Only Glimpses (1887)
 Ferns of Wisconsin

Notes

References

Attribution
 
 
 
 

1846 births
1934 deaths
People from Deerfield, New Hampshire
Writers from New Hampshire
Clubwomen
Lecturers
Vassar College alumni
University of Chicago alumni
Daughters of the American Revolution people
19th-century American writers
19th-century American women writers